Run with the Hunted is a 2019 American action crime drama film written and directed by John Swab, and starring Michael Pitt, Sam Quartin, Ron Perlman, Mark Boone Junior, William Forsythe and Dree Hemingway.

It was released in the United States on June 26, 2020 by Vertical Entertainment.

Plot
A young lad Oscar, whilst defending his young friend Loux, kills her abusive father; so he flees his rural hometown. During his run, he encounters love, crime and corruption and eventually, 15 years on, finds himself the leader of a band of lost children. At the same time, Loux relocates to the same city seeking a better life. Loux finds a job with a sore-headed private investigator and stumbles on Oscar's old missing child report. She then takes it upon herself to find Oscar who had years before saved her life.

Cast

 Michael Pitt as Oscar
 Sam Quartin as Loux
 Ron Perlman as Birdie
 Mark Boone Junior as Sway
 William Forsythe as Augustus
 Dree Hemingway as Peaches
 Kylie Rogers as Young Peaches
 Isiah Whitlock Jr. as Lester

Production
It was screened at the Woodstock Film Festival on October 3, 2019. In April 2020, Vertical Entertainment acquired North American distribution rights to the film. It was released on June 26, 2020.

Critical reception

References

External links
 

2019 films
2019 crime action films
2019 action drama films
American crime action films
2010s English-language films
2010s American films